St. Nicholas Cathedral is a 13th-century Gothic church in Elbląg, Poland. Established in circa 1247, the church became Lutheran in 1573. It was damaged by fire in the late 18th century and suffered damage during World War II. It was elevated to the status of cathedral in 1992.

History
When the burghers of Elbing (Elbląg) first attempted to adopt the Protestant Reformation in 1525, the provost of St. Nicholas Church maintained Catholic practice. Since 1539 the city council tacitly tolerated and gradually openly promoted Lutheranism, so that St. Nicholas Church had become a Lutheran church by 1573.

Following King Sigismund III's Prussian regency contract (1605) with Joachim Frederick of Brandenburg and his Prussian enfeoffment contract (Treaty of Warsaw, 1611) with John Sigismund of Brandenburg these two rulers of Ducal Prussia guaranteed free practice of Catholic religion in prevailingly Lutheran Prussia. Based on these contracts Prince-Bishop Szymon Rudnicki of Ermland/Warmia achieved the restitution of St. Nicholas as Roman Catholic parish church in 1612, then the only one in Elbing, and remaining a Catholic church since.

St. Nicholas was damaged by fire in the late 18th century, then destroyed in World War II and reconstructed. In 1992, the building was elevated to the status of cathedral.

References

Elblag
Nicholas
Elblag
Elblag